The 2017 IAAF World Cross Country Championships was hosted in the city of Kampala, Uganda's capital. This 42nd edition was held on 26 March 2017. The venue was Kampala Airport, commonly known as Kololo airstrip, or officially, the Kololo Ceremonial Grounds. A few modifications were made to make the track challenging.

Schedule
In keeping with past events, all five races, including the newly introduced mixed relay, were held in the afternoon. The first event was the inaugural mixed relay race, which was won by Kenya. The junior races preceded the senior races, and the senior men's event concluded the programme.

Medallists

Medal table 

Note: Totals include both individual and team medals, with medals in the team competition counting as one medal.

Participation
A total of 553 athletes from 59 countries were scheduled to participate. A Refugee Athletics team was scheduled to participate in the mixed relay, but did not take part.

References

External links
Official website
IAAF competition website

 
2017
World Cross Country Championships
World Cross Country Championships
2017 in Ugandan sport
International sports competitions hosted by Uganda
Athletics competitions in Uganda
Cross country running in Uganda
March 2017 sports events in Africa
Sport in Kampala